Mareil-Marly is a commune in the Yvelines department in the Île-de-France region in north-central France.

Transportation
The train station built in 2004 is used to travel to Saint-Nom-la-Bretèche and Paris (Gare Saint-Lazare).
Further extensions to the train line have since been completed extending the line to other western suburbs of Paris. The Résalys line R5 has a few stops going towards Saint-Germain-en-Laye and Fourqueux.

See also
Communes of the Yvelines department

References

External links

Mareil-Marly official website

Communes of Yvelines